The Mexican Central League was a Minor League Baseball circuit that operated for 19 seasons, from 1960 through 1978, with several clubs based across Mexico.

History
The Mexican Central League was formed in 1960 at the Class D level. It was placed in Class C in 1961, where it remained through the 1962 season. Upon the reorganization of Minor League Baseball in 1963, it was reclassified as Class A. In 1979, the circuit was absorbed into the expanded Mexican Baseball League (Liga Mexicana de Beisbol). This expansion elevated the Mexican Central League teams to Triple-A, with the newly expanded Mexican Baseball League featuring a 20-team circuit with four divisions.

Cities represented/Teams

Acámbaro, Guanajuato
Acámbaro (1975–1976)
Aguascalientes, Aguascalientes
Tigres de Aguascalientes (1960–1963; 1965; 1969–1974)
Broncos de Aguascalientes (1966–1967)
Arandas, Jalisco
Arandas (1977)
Jalisco (1977)
Celaya, Guanajuato
Cajeteros de Celaya (1960–1961; 1975)
Cerro Azul, Veracruz
Cerro Azul (1978)
Ciudad Madero, Tamaulipas
Bravos de Ciudad Madero (1968–1970)
Ciudad Mante, Tamaulipas
Broncos de Ciudad Mante (1969–1970)
Cañeros de Ciudad Mante (1971)
Azucareros de Ciudad Mante (1973–1974)
Ciudad Mante (1977)
 Ciudad Miguel Alemán, Tamaulipas
Miguel Alemán (1978)
Ciudad Valles, San Luis Potosí
Ciudad Valles (1974, 1978)
Ciudad Victoria, Tamaulipas
Henequeneros de Ciudad Victoria (1971; 1973-1974)
Ciudad Victoria (1976 –1978)
Cortazar, Guanajuato
Cortazar (1975)
Durango, Durango
Alacranes de Durango (1965–1967; 1973–1974)
Algodoneros de Durango (1972)
 Ebano, San Luis Potosí
Rojos de Ebano (1971–1974)
Ebano (1977)
Fresnillo, Zacatecas
Rojos de Fresnillo (1962)
Charros de Fresnillo (1964)
Mineros de Fresnillo (1965–1968; 1976–1978)
Guadalajara, Jalisco
Charros de Guadalajara (1977–1978)
Guanajuato, Guanajuato
Tuzos de Guanajuato (1960–1967; 1975–1976; 1978)
Gustavo Díaz Ordaz, Tamaulipas
Díaz Ordaz (1978)
La Barca, Jalisco
La Barca (1978)
Lagos de Moreno, Jalisco
Lagos de Moreno Caporales (1975–1977)
León, Guanajuato
Diablos Rojos de León (1960) 
Aguilas de León (1961)
Diablos Verdes de León (1962–1963; 1965-1966)
Broncos de León (1964)
Bravos de León (1967; 1971; 1975)
Aguiluchos de León (1968–1970)
Matamoros, Tamaulipas
Matamoros (1978)
Monterrey, Nuevo León
Indios de Monterrey (1970–1971)
Sultanes de Monterrey (1972)
Morelia, Michoacán
 Tigres de Morelia (1966)
Naranjos, Veracruz
Naranjos (1972–1973)
Nuevo Laredo, Tamaulipas
Tecolotes de Nuevo Laredo (1968)
Parras de la Fuente, Coahuila
Saraperos de Parras (1974)
Salamanca, Guanajuato
Petroleros de Salamanca (1960–1962; 1975)
Tigres de Salamanca (1964–1965)
Saltillo, Coahuila
Sultanes de Saltillo (1964)
Saraperos de Saltillo (1967–1969) 
San Luis Potosí, San Luis Potosí
Tuneros de San Luis Potosí (1960–1962)
Indios de San Luis Potosí (1963)
Rojos de San Luis Potosí (1963–1966)
Charros de San Luis Potosí (1969–1970)
Tuneros de San Luis Potosí (1971)
San Pedro, Coahuila
Algodoneros de San Pedro (1974)
Silao, Guanajuato
Catarinos de Silao (1978)
 Tampico, Tamaulipas
Piratas de Tampico (1967–1969)
Algodoneros de Tampico (1970)
Tamuín, San Luis Potosí
Tamuin Cafeteritos (1973)
Teocaltiche, Jalisco
Teocaltiche (1977–1978)
Torreón, Coahuila
Algodoneros de Torreón (1968)
Uriangato, Guanajuato
Uriangato (1975)
Zacatecas, Zacatecas
Pericos de Zacatecas (1965–1967)
Petroleros de Zacatecas (1968–1970)
Tuzos de Zacatecas (1971–1973; 1976–1978)

Notable players
21  Héctor Espino – Began his career in 1960 with the Tuneros de San Luis Potosí
34  Fernando Valenzuela – Began his career in 1978 with the Tuzos de Guanajuato

See also
Baseball awards#Mexico

References

1960 establishments in Mexico
1978 disestablishments in Mexico
Defunct baseball leagues in Mexico
Winter baseball leagues